Ralph Penza (November 22, 1932 – February 16, 2007) was an American senior correspondent and substitute anchor for WNBC in New York City. He first joined WNBC in 1980, left the station in 1995 and rejoined it in October 1997. Among his many honors are six Emmy Awards and two New York Press Club Gold Typewriter awards. He is credited by peers within the journalism community with introducing the 'walking head shot' whereby the reporter literally walked the audience through the scene of the crime, event, etc. The technique has been widely emulated and is currently taught at Columbia University and NYU.

Penza had done reporting in Coatesville, Pennsylvania and Waterloo, Iowa. Prior to joining WNBC, Penza worked as news director at WSAV-TV in Savannah, Georgia, anchor and reporter at WDVM in Washington, D.C., an anchor at WCAU in Philadelphia, a producer, reporter and anchor at WCBS, and a producer at WABC.

While in high school Penza served as a copy boy for Walter Winchell. Penza graduated from New York University, where he was a member of Alpha Phi Delta, with a bachelor's degree in radio and television. Previous to that he had graduated from Valley Stream Central High School in Valley Stream, New York. He lived most of his adult life in Malverne, immediately adjacent to his boyhood hometown in Valley Stream.

In February 1998, while covering Pope John Paul II's trip to Cuba, Penza located Joanne Chesimard, who was convicted of killing New Jersey state trooper Werner Foerster 24 years earlier. She was sentenced to life in prison but escaped in 1979 and fled to Cuba for political asylum. She spoke to Penza in an interview where she maintained her innocence and recounted the night of the shooting. Penza's coverage of the Pope's visit to the Holy Land earned him an Emmy Award in 2000.

Personal life and death
Penza died from an undisclosed illness at the age of 74 in 2007. He was survived by his wife Lucille and two children. Penza's daughter Christina was an Emmy Award-winning television producer in Los Angeles (KNBC, a reporter at Los Angeles station UPN 13, and a general and investigative reporter at Las Vegas KLAS and Fort Myers, Florida WINK-TV television stations. She currently is the CEO of Los Angeles-based Attorneys Edge, a production company that uses digital video to recreate visual evidence for court trials. His son Ralph Scott is an audiobook producer and narrator who records audiobooks along with his wife Kendra and produces serialized audio drama in the San Francisco Bay area. The two have won multiple awards for their work in audio drama.

References

External links

1932 births
2007 deaths
American male journalists
People from Malverne, New York
American television journalists
Television anchors from New York City
New York (state) television reporters
New York University alumni
Television anchors from Philadelphia
Television anchors from Washington, D.C.
American people of Italian descent
People from Valley Stream, New York
Valley Stream Central High School alumni